Long Island, historically called Inishfada, is an island that lies south of Schull, County Cork, Ireland. It has a permanent population of no more than 10. The island’s most distinctive landmark is Copper Point lighthouse at its eastern end, marking the entrance to Schull Harbour.

History 
In the 1840s the island had over 300 inhabitants, and the remains of this can be seen by the abandoned cottages and ruins that are left behind.

Services 
Long Island has a surfaced road on part of the island, and an overgrown road extends to an old copper mine. Farming is the primary economic activity on the island. There is a regular ferry service from Colla Pier to the island, operating 5 days a week during the summer months and three days a week during the winter months. Long Island is supplied with mains electricity from the mainland through a submarine power cable.

Geography 
The body of water parting it from the mainland is called Long Island Channel. It is accessible only by boat.

See also 
West Cork
List of islands of Ireland

References 

Islands of County Cork
Geography of County Cork